Juan Manuel Quevedo (born 15 November 1983) is an Argentinian former footballer. His last club was Club Almagro.

References
 

1983 births
Living people
Argentine footballers
Argentine expatriate footballers
San Lorenzo de Almagro footballers
Estudiantes de Buenos Aires footballers
Rampla Juniors players
Club Deportivo Palestino footballers
Expatriate footballers in Chile
Expatriate footballers in Uruguay
Unión Magdalena footballers
Association football midfielders
Footballers from Buenos Aires